Narendra Kumar is an Indian politician and the current Member of Parliament from Jhunjhunu parliamentary constituency.

References

Lok Sabha members from Rajasthan
Living people
Bharatiya Janata Party politicians from Rajasthan
Year of birth missing (living people)